Eva Murati (born 25 May 1995) is an Albanian actress and TV host. Starting her career at the age of 15, she made herself known in Albanian showbiz through different commercials and modeling jobs. Eva hosted her first TV program Antilope in 2013  and then she co-hosted with Adi Krasta Duartrokitje, both of them at Agon Channel. She then moved to Vizion Plus in 2016 where she hosted Miss Universe Albania and VIP Zone. She is currently hosting the Studio UEFA Champions League and Sports Week at Tring Sport. Murati debuted in film in The Outlaw in 2013. She then starred in 2017 in Ti mund të më quash Xhon. In 2016 she starred in the TV series Skanderbeg. Her most recent project is Familja Kuqezi which is currently filming.

Early life

Early childhood 
Murati was born in 1995, daughter of Doctor Arben Murati and engineer Anila Stratobërdha Murati. She was born in Elbasan, but her family moved in the capital of Albania, Tirana, when she was at the age of 6.  She has two younger siblings, a brother and a sister. She is the granddaughter of Pandi Stratobërdha, hydrotechnical engineer, founder of University of Tirana in 1957 and member of Academy of Sciences of Albania since its founding in 1972.

Education 

While living in Elbasan, she attended Imelda Lambertini, the Italian school where she learned to speak Italian and was introduced to Italian culture which had a big influence in her life. After her family moved in Tirana she attended Udha e Shkronjave school. At the sixth grade she moved to The Independent College of Tirana where she finished middle school. Murati completed her high school studies at Petro Nini Luarasi high school, where she won her first audition and made her first steps into show business.  She pursued her academic career and majored in law at the Faculty of Law at the public University of Tirana.

She took part in Tirana Teens and later was part of the school drama club. Alongside her academic pursuits she was selected for the debate team in multiple high school competitions. During her school years she competed for various years at Mathematics and General Knowledge Olympiad, where she achieved 8th place in National Ranking.

Career

Modeling and Commercials 
After entering high school she participated in her first audition for Tirana East Gate which she won. Murati starred in the spot Bring a Friend for Eagle Mobile alongside comedian Gentian Zenelaj. The spot aired during the UEFA European Championship 2012.

Murati was the image of B52 Energy Drink in two commercials, Anything for You and Drink On in February 2012 and November 2012 respectively.

She appeared in the Aurela Gace’s music video TRANZIT which won the best video in the annual competition Netët e Klipit Shqiptar in May 2012.

In 2015, Murati was chosen to represent Albania in the Vodafone Italia commercial produced by to promote calls from Italy to Albania. The company chose her after seeing Murati's interview with Italian actress Manuela Arcuri which she previously did in Agon Channel. The campaign lasted a year and was distributed all over Italy.

She became the image of Albtelecom in the role of Era in the sitcom-like commercials. She starred in Intro Era, Lea, Dhuratat e Mirënjohjes, Anoying Chef, Intro Jona, ALBwifi, Déjà vu, Love, You deserve More and Super-Family from April 2016 to May 2017. After starring in the first Albtelecom commercial, Murati was chosen by this company as a spokesperson. She presented the company in various events such as UEFA Euro 2016.

She modeled for Sherri Hill Albania in 2013 in Berat photographed by Fadil Berisha.

Murati appeared as a cover girl for Vip Albania magazine in December 2013 Later she appeared in the monthly Who magazine in the April 2016 issue for presenting Miss Universe Albania. The cover of Living magazine Spring 2017 issue was to introduce to the public her new project, UEFA Champions League. Eva Murati is the youngest person to appear in the cover of this magazine, at the age of 21.

Hosting and Presentation

Agon Channel 
Eva had her breakthrough in television at the age of 18 when she started working at Agon Channel, an Italian-Albanian television channel, in October 2013 where she was the host of primetime show Antilope, which gave her the opportunity to interview Italian stars such as Manuela Arcuri, Enzo Iacchetti, etc. Later she co-hosted the gala show Duartrokitje with one of the historic personalities of Albanian television, Adi Krasta. The show aimed to bring focus to Albanian artists who live and work abroad. In the summer of 2014 Murati left Agon Channel to pursue other projects.

Vizion Plus 
Murati took a year off from television to focus on her acting career while working on films and TV series then to make a return in March 2016 when she was offered to host Finding Miss Universe Albania. The beauty pageant had a different structure from the previous years as the show lasted for four months.

At the start of the new television season 2016-17 she hosted the newest program of Vizion Plus national television, VIP Zone, a cultural and lifestyle program. She interviewed various public figures. The show also promoted tourism and new cultures.

She then hosted Studio UEFA Champions League, which started in January 2017. This meant a wider audience because of the influence that football has in Albania. After the positive reception the program had, Murati will also host the Studio UEFA Champions League 2017-18. She presented Sports Week, which aired every Sunday at Tring Sport News HD from June 2017.

Other Presentations 

Murati presented One Billion Rising the feministic movement at Dëshmoret e Kombit Avenue, in which thousands of women took part by dancing the Break the Chain choreography.

Murati hosted the 8th of March annual concert at the Palace of Congresses, which was in honor of International Women's Day. This event was attended by many political figures and was concluded with a speech by then prime minister of Albania, Sali Berisha.  
On the behalf of the 100th anniversary of Albania's Independence, Murati hosted the concert on 29 November 2012. 
The 2016 New Year's Eve Classical Concert was hosted by Murati and TV host Xhani Shqerra.

Other Appearances 

She presented Miss Universe Albania, and was invited to be part of the jury at Miss Teen Albania 2016. 
Murati was also part of the jury in the TV Show Shopping Night aired in Vizion Plus and Living HD as a fashion adviser.

She appeared in the sketch-show Apartamenti 2XL, and various talk shows, cooking shows.

Film 

Eva Murati made her debut as an actress in May 2013 in the short movie The Outlaw. The movie premiered in October 2013 in Tirana and was part of Durres Film Festival.

In December 2016 Murati took part in the artistic project EKSOD by Justin Fernando Valls in role of Juna. Inspired by the political events of the time EKSOD produced by JFV Production showed the desire of young adults to leave Albania due to lack of opportunities and not achieving goals because of the corrupted system.

Murati starred in her first full-length movie Ti mund të më quash Xhon (translated: You can call me John) in the role of Alba Basha alongside Genti Kame, Gezim Rudi and Ermira Gjata. She initially won the audition for the role of Lorna, but she rejected it due to personal reasons. In this teenage drama she played the free spirited teenager, who comes from a rich family with political engagement. She is also Lorna's best friend. The movie was produced by Papadhimitri Production. It premiered on 29 of March 2017 at Millennium and Imperial Cinemas.

TV Series 

In December 2015 Murati had her TV show debut as a guest star on Kokrrat. She appeared in the fifth episode of the series as a pharmacist and the lead character's love interest, by the name of Eva. The show was produced by Digitalb and also aired on T HD and IN TV.

In 2016 she starred in the TV show Skanderbeg in the role of Mara, the fictional sister of Albania's national hero, George Castriot Skanderbeg, alongside Laert Vasili, Ermal Mamaqi, Vedat Bajrami and Zyliha Miloti. The show it's considered as the highest budged series in the history of Albania. The TV series was directed by American director Adam Pray and produced by Digitalb and Cukali Production.
 
Eva Murati will star in the upcoming Kangur Tv Show TV show, written and directed by Luan Kryeziu, produced by Iliria Film Production.  The show started production in June 2017 and is currently filming in Albania.

Her most recent project is Familja Kuqezi which is currently filming.

Theater 

Murati had her theatrical debut at Bertolt Brecht’s adaptation of The Threepenny Opera in the protagonist role of Polly Peachum. 
Later she proved herself as a singer and dancer in the musical adaptation of Shakespeare’s play The Two Gentlemen of Verona in the leading role of Sylvia.

Personal life 

Eva is known for being an animal rights supporter and activist. While she was presenting Miss Universe Albania, she becomes supporter of Albanian Red Cross and she is an actively known member since then. She often expressed Liberal thoughts, although Murati has never expressed her political views.

Since the start of her career with One Billion Rising movement, Murati is considered a feminist and has always been an advocate of gender equality. She often expressed that there should be more reforms to help women emancipation especially in Albania and has used her image to influence young women to be more independent. Eva is fluent in English, Italian and Spanish and has knowledge of French.

Eva also follows football and supports the Italian team Juventus. Her father, Erjon was also a footballer.

Filmography

Film

Television

Stage

See also 

 Television in Albania
 UEFA Champions League
 Vizion Plus
 Tring
 Tip TV
 Tring Sport
 TV Klan

References

External links 
 
 

1995 births
Living people
Albanian female models
Albanian actresses
Albanian film actresses
Albanian television actresses
Albanian stage actresses
21st-century Albanian actresses
People from Elbasan